Lower Sandy Point, Nova Scotia  is a community in the Shelburne County, Nova Scotia, Canada.

References

Communities in Shelburne County, Nova Scotia
Populated coastal places in Canada